Catherine Hunter  is an Australian filmmaker, journalist, television producer and director.

Hunter joined the Nine Network's Sunday program in 1985.  After two decades of producing documentary-length cover stories on the arts, she left the program in 2006 to work as a freelance documentary maker, specialising in films about Australian artists. Most of her independent films have been broadcast on ABC TV.

In addition to her broadcast documentaries, Hunter has contributed commissioned films for the Art Gallery of New South Wales and the National Portrait Gallery in conjunction with exhibitions of Australian and international artists, including Anselm Kiefer. In 2006 she received a Commendation in the Walkley Awards for Journalism for her profile on architect Peter Stutchbury and in the same year won the Australian Institute of Architects prize for architectural journalism.

In 2009 Hunter’s documentary on Sidney Nolan examined the influences of his relationships with the three women who shaped his life.

Hunter visited Jeffrey Smart at his farmhouse in Tuscany while filming her documentary on the great Australian painter, and he takes the film crew to some of the places near Arezzo that have long inspired him, the concrete streetscapes and urban wastelands that define his vision.

Hunter’s method is to spend time filming with her subjects at times of great personal and professional significance, often over a period of many years. In 2010 she returned to the subject of an earlier film, Margaret Olley, following the artist as she completed her last works, painted in the 18 months leading up to her death on 26 July 2011. In early 2012 Hunter was with artist Jenny Sages as she dealt with the death of her husband Jack and produced the grieving self-portrait that would cause such a sensation at the Archibald Prize.

Australia’s greatest living architect, Glenn Murcutt, allowed Hunter to follow him for nearly a decade as he undertook a rare public commission, a mosque for the Newport Islamic community in Melbourne – a strikingly contemporary building without minarets and domes, designed to be physically and psychologically inclusive. Hunter documents the growing acceptance of the design, weaving into the narrative the stories of his famous domestic commissions, interviews with those involved, and an intimate biography of his life. The Australian newspaper described Hunter’s film as “beguiling and beautifully balanced.” 

Australian artist Ben Quilty gave Hunter unprecedented access to his intimate process over more than a decade, exploring the journey that led him to the battlefields of Afghanistan as Australia’s official war artist. Hunter followed the artist as he completed one of his most challenging art works, an exploration of the Myall Creek massacre.  In October 2019 the film screened to sold out sessions at the Brisbane International Film Festival.  The film has been lauded by critics with one reviewer noting that “director Catherine Hunter creates an open door into a world of great artists that is unavailable to most of us.  Hunter has crafted a film that is engrossing from the start but that builds to something more emotionally encompassing when Quilty’s final painting is revealed.”

Filmography
Anselm Kiefer: Aperiatur terra  (2007)
China's Avant-Garde: The New Cultural Revolution (2009) 
Glenn Murcutt: Architecture for Place (2009)
Sidney Nolan: Mask and Memory (2009)
Inland Heart: The Photography of Jeff Carter (2010)
Wendy Sharpe: The Imagined Life (2010)
Margaret Olley: A Life In Paint (2012)
Jenny Sages: Paths to Portraiture (2012)
Roger Law: A Law Unto Himself (2012)
William Robinson: A Painter’s Journey (2012)
Jeffrey Smart: Master of Stillness (2012)
Savannah Country: The Art of Julie Poulsen and Jenny Valmadre (2012)
The Holtermann Legacy (2013)
TarraWarra Museum of Art: An Enduring Passion (2013)
Cox Architecture: Transitions in Landscape (2014)
Trent Parke: The Black Rose (2015). Includes Trent Parke, Narelle Autio and Geoff Dyer.
Glenn Murcutt: Spirit of Place  (2016)
Australia’s Lost Impressionist: John Russell  (2018)
Quilty: Painting the Shadows (2019)

References

External links
Interview with Catherine Hunter
Catherine Hunter Productions

1960 births
Living people
Australian filmmakers
Australian journalists